This is the discography of American rapper Turk.

Albums

Studio albums

Mixtapes

Singles

As lead artist

As featured artist

1996 - Our Thang - Durdy Jack Lex Ball/Baby - Platinum Status

1998 - Hypnotize Cash Money - Tear Da Club Up Thugs/Hot Boys - Crazyndalazdayz

1999 - Ballas - Project Pat /Hot Boys - Ghetty Green

1999 - Bring Da Pain - Blaxuede/Lil' Wayne - Dey Don't Kno

1999 - Tha Hood (It's All Good) - Hot Boys/Big Tymers - The Wood

1999 - Make 'Em Break It - Lil' Keke/Hot Boys/Big Tymers - It Was All A Dream

1999 - Play That Sh*t (Remix) - DJ Clue/CNN/Hot Boys - Queens Day Part 1

1999 - Rock Ice - Hot Boys/Big Tymers - Blue Streak

1999 - Servin' It Hot - Servin' Da World Click/Hot Boys/Big Tymers - Shippin' N Handlin'

1999 - Tear The Club Up (Remix) - DJ Whoo Kid/Tear The Club Up Thugs/Hot Boys - DJ Whoo Kid Goin Platinum

1999 - U Don't Wanna - J Prince/Hot Boys/Big Tymers - Realest Niggaz Down South

2000 - Baller Blockin' - E-40/Baby/Juvenile - Baller Blockin'

2000 - Uptown - B.G. - Baller Blockin'

2000 - Let Us Stunt - Big Tymers/B.G. - Baller Blockin'

2000 - Hey Ya - Strings/Hot Boys/Big Tymers - Tongue Song

2000 - Told U - Malone/Baby - Hustler 3 - Hustler 3

2000 - Dirty World - T.C/Lil' Derrick/Juvenile - 3rd Coast Finest

2000 - Tear It Down - Zoe Pound/B.G. - Little Haiti Stories

2001 - Steady Grinding - Mack 10/Baby - Exit Wounds

2001 - Murder - Mack 10/Big Tymers - Bang Or Ball

2001 - Low Down & Dirty - Smoked Outt/Lil' Derrick - Done Didit

2001 - What Side R U On - Jerzey Mob/Hot Boys - Outlawz Presents

2002 - Cleanin' Out My Closet (Freestyle) - Larrell - Freestyles And Unreleased

2002 - F*ck Cash Money - Larrell - Freestyles And Unreleased

2002 - Tear It Down (Remix) Red Eye/B.G. - Da Dirty South Shit Vol. 1

2003 - Uptown Downtown - 7th Ward Soulja/B.G. - Ghetto Terminology

2003 - What You Are - Lil' Derrick/Kayotic - Undisputed Champions Knockout

2003 - Throw Your Sets Up - Tru Thug - The Storm

2003 - Tellin U - Tru Thug - The Storm

2004 - Stuntin' - Bumpy Johnson/Kenoe - Tha Hustle Life Vol.1 & Vol.2

2004 - Gun Bust - Dro/Hitman/Sammy Sam - Respect The Connected

2004 - Come Up - Froze Ony - Gutta Wayz

2004 - I Don't Know Whats Wrong - Ke'Noe - Game Over

2004 - Bitchn*gga - Mac-E/Da Inc - Da Nu Boi

2004 - Whatchabout - Mac-E - Da Nu Boi

2004 - Ain't No Fun (When Rabbit Got The Gun) - Slugga/Young Thugga - Rookie Of The Year

2004 - Murda, Murda - Yung Ro/Mippy - Undagrind

2005 - She's A Huker - AJ 003/Ying Yang Twinz - AJ 003

2005 - Over A Ho - Handy - Rap Hustlin'

2005 - Dat's Right - Iceberg/Froze Ony - Slab Muzic

2005 - Road Bitch - Iceberg/Froze Ony - Slab Muzic

Guest appearances

References

External links
 
 
 

Discographies of American artists
Hip hop discographies